Nakseongdae Station is a station on Seoul Subway Line 2. This station is named after a nearby place called Nakseongdae (落星垈), which literally means 'the site of the fallen star' and is the birthplace of the great Goryeo general Gang Gam-chan, (which is also the second name of this station) best known for his heroics against an invading Khitan force in the Battle of Gwiju.

This station is located in Bongcheon-dong, Gwanak-gu, Seoul.

Station layout

References

Metro stations in Gwanak District
Seoul Metropolitan Subway stations
Railway stations opened in 1983
1983 establishments in South Korea
20th-century architecture in South Korea